Mateus Aparecido de Oliveira Fonseca (born 19 August 1995), known as Mateus Oliveira, is a Brazilian footballer who plays for Costa Rica Esporte Clube as a forward.

Club career
Born in Londrina, Paraná, Mateus Oliveira joined Coritiba's youth setup in 2010, aged 15. On 6 May 2015 he made his senior debut, coming on as a late substitute for Rafhael Lucas in a 1–2 away loss against Fortaleza, for the year's Copa do Brasil.

On 10 May Mateus Oliveira made his Série A debut, again from the bench in a 1–2 defeat at Chapecoense.

References

External links
Mateus Oliveira at Coritiba] 

Mateus Oliveira at playmakerstats.com (English version of ogol.com.br)

1995 births
Living people
Sportspeople from Londrina
Brazilian footballers
Association football forwards
Campeonato Brasileiro Série A players
Campeonato Brasileiro Série D players
Coritiba Foot Ball Club players
Camboriú Futebol Clube players